Jog may refer to:
 Jogging
 Jog (dislocations), a term in materials science, dislocation theory
 Jog (raga)
 Jog Falls, India's highest waterfall
 jog.fm, a music website
 Yogyakarta, Indonesia
 Adisucipto International Airport in Yogyakarta, Indonesia, by IATA code
 Jolt Online Gaming
 Junior Offshore Group, a British sailing yacht race organiser
 Lancaster John O' Gaunt Rowing Club
 Wii jOG, an accessory for the Wii gaming console
 Yamaha Jog, a scooter
 Jog, to move slowly through audio or video media on a media player by operating a jog dial

People 
 Anant Jog, Indian actor
 Chanda Jog (born 1954), Indian astrophysicist
 Gauri Jog (born 1970), Indian-American Indian classical dancer
 Kshitee Jog, Indian actress
 Ramchandra Shripad Jog (1901–1980), Indian writer
 V. G. Jog (1922–2004), Indian violinist
 Jog Meher Shrestha, Nepalese politician